Asturias Forum (Foro), previously known as Forum of Citizens (FAC) is a regionalist political party in the Principality of Asturias.

History
Asturias Forum was founded in January 2011 by former Deputy Prime Minister Francisco Álvarez Cascos, who left the People's Party (PP) after failing to be selected as the party's candidate for President of the Principality of Asturias in the 2011 election.

In the Asturian election, Álvarez Cascos led the party under the name "Forum of Citizens". FAC won sixteen seats, making it the largest party on the General Council. Together with the PP, FAC's gains gave the centre-right a majority in Asturias for the first time.  The party has spoken to all three other parties to create a more consensual political climate.

At the November 2011 Spanish election, the party won one of Asturias's eight seats in the Congress of Deputies.

After months of deadlock in the Asturian regional assembly, fresh elections were held, in which FAC lost 4 seats, becoming the second largest party behind the Spanish Socialist Workers' Party (PSOE).

On 12 February 2015, Francisco Álvarez-Cascos surprisingly announced he would not stand again as Asturias Forum's candidate and resigned to the presidency of the party. Álvarez-Cascos was succeeded by Cristina Coto, while he went on to become the party's secretary-general.

After the resignation of Cristina Coto due to differences with Álvarez Cascos, Carmen Moriyón, mayoress of Gijón, was elected new president of the party on 29 September 2018.

Presidents
Francisco Álvarez-Cascos 2011–2015
Cristina Coto 2015–2018
Carmen Moriyón 2018–present

Electoral performance

Cortes Generales

Asturias

 * Within People's Party–Asturias Forum.

General Junta of the Principality of Asturias

European Parliament

Footnotes

Political parties in Asturias
Political parties established in 2011
2011 establishments in Spain
Catholic political parties
Centrist parties in Spain